Filatima ornatifimbriella is a moth of the family Gelechiidae. It is found in North America, where it has been recorded from Colorado, Arizona, Texas, Nebraska and Illinois.

The length of the forewings is 6.5-8.5 mm. The scales on the forewings are pale greyish brown basally, dark brown distally, each scale gradually widened from the base. The anterior margin of the wing is dark brown basally, becoming mottled dark brown and grey to three-fourths, then pale greyish brown. There is a dark-brown subcircular spot at three-fifths of the cell and one at the end of the cell. The hindwings are pale greyish brown, darkening slightly to the apex.

The larvae feed on Amorpha fruticosa.

References

Moths described in 1864
Filatima